Fanlew is an unincorporated community located in southern Jefferson County, Florida, United States.

Location
Fanlew is located west of State Road 59 at Fanlew Road, and at the east end of Natural Bridge Rd., which comes out of neighboring Leon County.

History

Fanlew began as a railway distribution center of the Florida Central Railroad and later the Atlantic Coast Line Railroad. The community served the sawmills and turpentine stills once in the area, with supplies moving in and timber and naval stores moving out. "Fanlew" is a combination of the names of John Lewis Philips, the founder of the Florida Central Railroad, and his wife Fannie.

Education
Jefferson County Schools operates public schools, including Jefferson County Middle / High School.

Geography
 Elevation: 30 feet (9 m)

References

Unincorporated communities in Jefferson County, Florida
Tallahassee metropolitan area
Unincorporated communities in Florida